No quarter, no mercy shown by a victor, who treats a vanquished opponent very harshly or refuses to spare a surrendering opponent's life.

No quarter may also refer to:

Arts, entertainment, and media
"No Quarter" (song), a song by Led Zeppelin
No Quarter: Jimmy Page and Robert Plant Unledded, an album by Page and Plant named after the above song
"No Quarter", a song by Scottish pirate folk metal band Alestorm from their album Black Sails at Midnight
No Quarter, a 1932 book by Alec Waugh
"No Quarter", an episode of the TV series Revolution
No Quarter, a popular modification of the video game Wolfenstein: Enemy Territory (2003)
"", in English translated as "No Quarter", a short story by Guy de Maupassant

Other uses
No Quarter, the motto of the destroyer USS Leary (DD-879)
No Quarter Pounder, an album by Dread Zeppelin
Ordinance of no quarter to the Irish, a decree passed by the English Parliament in 1644

See also
Take no prisoners